Jane Nartare Beaumont (born 10 September 1956), Arnna Kathleen Beaumont (born 11 November 1958) and Grant Ellis Beaumont (born 12 July 1961), collectively known as the Beaumont children, were three Australian siblings who disappeared from Glenelg Beach near Adelaide, South Australia, on 26 January 1966 (Australia Day) in a suspected abduction and murder. At the time of their disappearance they were aged nine, seven and four years, respectively.

Police investigations revealed that, on the day of their disappearance, several witnesses had seen the three children on and near Glenelg Beach in the company of a tall man with fairish to light-brown hair and a thin face with a sun-tanned complexion and medium build, aged in his mid-thirties. Confirmed sightings of the children occurred at the Colley Reserve and at Wenzel's cake shop on Moseley Street, Glenelg. Despite numerous searches, neither the children nor their suspected companion were located.

The case received worldwide attention and is credited with causing a change in Australian lifestyles, since parents began to believe that their children could no longer be presumed to be safe when unsupervised in public. In recent years, police and media speculation has linked the disappearances to the Adelaide Oval abductions of 1973. Interest in the case has continued more than half a century on. , a $1 million reward has been offered for information related to the cold case by the South Australian government.

Background

Jane, Arnna and Grant Beaumont lived with their parents, Grant "Jim" Beaumont, a former serviceman and driver for Suburban Taxis, and Nancy Beaumont (née Ellis), who had married in December 1955. Their house was at 109 Harding Street, Somerton Park, a suburb of Adelaide, South Australia, not far from Glenelg Beach, a popular spot that the children and many others at the height of the surf music era often visited. On 25 January, in the midst of a summer heatwave, Jim dropped the children off at Glenelg Beach before heading off on a three-day sales trip to Snowtown.

On the morning of 26 January 1966, the children asked their mother to visit Glenelg Beach again. As it was too hot to walk, they took a five-minute, three-kilometre bus journey from their home to the beach. They caught the bus at 8:45 am and were expected to return home on the 12:00 noon bus. Nancy became worried, however, when the children did not return on either the 12:00 or 2:00 pm buses, and when Jim returned home early from his trip around 3:00 pm, he immediately drove to the crowded beach. Unable to locate the children, he returned and together they searched the streets and visited friends' houses. Around 5:30 pm, they went to the Glenelg Police Station to report the disappearance.

Police investigation
Police quickly organised a search of Glenelg Beach and adjacent areas, based on the assumption that the children were nearby and had simply lost track of time. The search then expanded to the sand-hills, ocean, and nearby buildings, with the airport, rail lines, and interstate roads being monitored as well, based on a fear of accident or kidnap. Within 24 hours, the entire nation was aware of the case. Within three days, on 29 January, the Adelaide Sunday Mail led with a headline of "Sex crime now feared", highlighting the rapidly evolving fear that they had been abducted and murdered by a sex offender. Despite this, the initial official reward was only A£250.

The Patawalonga Boat Haven was drained on 29 January after a woman told police that she had spoken with three children, who were similar in description to the Beaumont children, near the haven at 7:00 pm on 26 January. Police cadets and members of the emergency operations group searched the area, but nothing was found.

Prime suspect
Police investigating the case found several witnesses who had seen the children in Colley Reserve, near Glenelg Beach, in the company of a tall man with fair to light brown hair and a thin face, and in his mid-thirties. He had a sun-tanned complexion and a thin-to-athletic build and was wearing swim trunks. The children were playing with him, and appeared to be relaxed and enjoying themselves. The man also approached one of the witnesses, asking if anyone had been near the children's belongings as their money was "missing". The man then went off to change while the children waited for him. The group were then seen walking away together from the beach some time later, which the police estimated to be around 12:15 pm.

The Beaumont parents described their children, particularly Jane, as shy. For them to be playing so confidently with a stranger seemed out of character. Investigators theorised that the children had perhaps met the man during a previous visit or visits and had grown to trust him. A chance remark at home, which seemed insignificant at the time, supports this theory. Arnna had told her mother that Jane had "got a boyfriend down the beach". Nancy thought she meant a playmate and took no further notice until after the disappearance.

A shopkeeper at nearby Wenzel's Bakery also reported Jane had bought pasties and a meat pie with a £1 note. Police viewed this as further evidence that the children had been with another person, for two reasons: the shopkeeper knew the children well from previous visits and reported that they had never purchased a meat pie before, and the children's mother had given them only six shillings and six pence, enough for their bus fare and lunch, and not £1. Police believed the money had been given to them by somebody else.

According to an initial statement, the Beaumont children were seen walking alone at about 3:00 pm, away from the beach along Jetty Road, in the general direction of their home. The witness, a postman, knew the children well, and his statement was regarded as reliable. He said the children were "holding hands and laughing" in the main street. Police could not determine why the reliable children, already one hour late, were strolling alone and seemingly unconcerned. The postman contacted police two days after his initial statement and said that he thought he saw them in the morning, not the afternoon as he had previously said. (This was the last police-confirmed sighting of the Beaumont children made available to the general public of Adelaide SA at the time.)

A local resident, Miss Daphne Gregory, sighted the children at about 3:00 pm with a man who "carried an airlines bag, similar to one owned by Jane Beaumont". The man was described as about 6ft tall, aged from 30 to 35, with light brown hair neatly brushed and parted on the left, high cheekbones, sun-reddened complexion and medium build.

Other sightings
Several months later, a woman reported that on the night of the disappearance, a man, accompanied by two girls and a boy, entered a neighbouring house that she had believed empty. Later, the woman said she had seen the boy walking alone along a lane where he was pursued and roughly caught by the man. The next morning the house appeared to be deserted again, and she saw neither the man nor the children again. Police could not establish why she had failed to provide this information earlier. Other reported sightings of the children continued for about a year after their disappearance.

Gerard Croiset
The Beaumont case attracted international attention. On 8 November 1966, Gerard Croiset, a Dutch psychic, was brought to Australia to assist in the search, causing a media frenzy. Croiset's efforts proved unsuccessful, with his story changing day-to-day and offering no clues. He identified a spot at a warehouse near the children's home in which he believed their bodies had been buried, inside the remains of an old brick kiln. The property owners, who were reluctant to excavate based only on a psychic's claim, soon bowed to public pressure after publicity helped raise $40,000 to have the building demolished. No remains, nor any evidence linking to any of the Beaumont family was found. In 1996, the building identified by Croiset was undergoing partial demolition and the owners allowed for a full search of the site. Once again, no trace was found of the children.

Hoax letters
About two years after the disappearance, the Beaumont parents received two letters: one was supposedly written by Jane, and another by a man who said he was keeping the children. The envelopes showed a postmark of Dandenong, Victoria. The brief notes described a relatively pleasant existence and referred to "The Man" who was keeping them. Police believed at the time that the letters could quite likely have been authentic after comparing them with others written by Jane. The letter from "The Man" said that he had appointed himself "guardian" of the children and was willing to hand them back to their parents. In the letter a meeting place was nominated.

The Beaumont parents, followed by a detective, drove to the designated place but nobody appeared. It was some time later that a third letter arrived, also purported to be from Jane, stating that the man had realised a disguised detective was present and that he decided to keep the children because the Beaumonts had betrayed his trust. There were no further letters. In 1992, new forensic examinations of the letters showed they were a hoax. Fingerprint technology had improved and the author was identified as a 41-year-old man who had been a teenager at the time and had written the letters as a joke. Because of the time that had elapsed, he was not charged with any offence.

Later developments
In November of 2013, excavation was initiated in the back of a North Plympton factory that had previously belonged to one possible suspect in the case, Harry Phipps (see below). Further excavation at a slightly different location on the site was undertaken in February of 2018, but nothing relevant was found. The excavations were based on two men reporting that as boys they had been paid to dig a hole in that area at around that time, and also based on geophysical testing which had identified anomalous disturbed soil. Animal bones were found, but nothing was found in relation to the Beaumont children.

Possible suspects

Bevan Spencer von Einem

Bevan Spencer von Einem (born 1946) was sentenced to life imprisonment in 1984 for murdering 15-year-old Richard Kelvin, son of Adelaide newsreader Rob Kelvin. Police and prosecutors publicly stated that they believed von Einem had accomplices and was possibly involved in additional murders. About this same time, police came to suspect von Einem of possible involvement in the Beaumont case. No accomplices were ever charged. Von Einem has refused to co-operate with investigators about his possible connection with other murders.

During the investigation into von Einem, police heard from an informant identified only as "Mr B". He related an alleged conversation in which von Einem boasted of having taken three children from a beach several years earlier, and said he had taken them home to conduct "experiments". Von Einem had said that he performed "brilliant surgery" on each of them, and had "connected them up". One of the children had supposedly died during the procedure and so he had killed the other two and dumped all the bodies in bushland south of Adelaide. Police had not previously considered von Einem in connection with the Beaumont children, but he somewhat resembled the descriptions and identikits from 1966.

According to Adelaide police detective Bob O'Brien, Mr B gave important information during the investigation into the Kelvin murder, and was regarded as a generally reliable source. However, police reception of the alleged confession was mixed. There were enough plausible details to warrant further research, yet other details relayed by Mr B did not fit with known facts and were regarded with skepticism by police. , von Einem had not been ruled out as a suspect.

While von Einem was known to have frequented Glenelg Beach to "perv" on the changing rooms, and was described as preoccupied with children, what argues against his involvement in the Beaumont case is that he was younger than the suspect seen with the children in 1966 (the suspect was reported to be in his mid- to late thirties, whereas von Einem was 20 or 21 at the time). Another important distinction is that he was convicted of murdering a 15-year-old boy and suspected of killing males in their teens and twenties; victims older than the Beaumont children or Joanne Ratcliffe and Kirste Gordon. Such disparities amongst victims of a serial killer are not unheard of, but unusual.

The reference to surgical experimentation von Einem had purportedly made to Mr B also corresponded to the coroner's reports on several of the murdered youths. Von Einem also told the witness that he had taken two girls from the Adelaide Oval during a football match, as Ratcliffe and Gordon had been; he said he had killed them but did not elaborate.

The cases of the Beaumont children and of the Adelaide Oval abductions remain officially open. However, von Einem matched the police sketches of the suspect in both the Beaumont and Oval cases and, in 1989, he was identified as a suspect in a confidential police report. In August 2007, it was reported that police were examining archival footage from the original Beaumont search, shot by Channel Seven, that shows a young man resembling von Einem among onlookers. The report said that police were calling for information to establish the man's identity.

Arthur Stanley Brown

Arthur Stanley Brown (1912–2002) was charged in 1998 with the murders of sisters Judith and Susan Mackay in Townsville, Queensland. They had disappeared on their way to school on 26 August 1970 and their bodies were found several days later in a dry creek bed. Both girls had been strangled. Brown's July 2000 trial was delayed after his lawyer applied for a section 613 verdict (unfit to be tried) from the jury. He was never retried as he was found to have dementia and Alzheimer's disease. Brown died in 2002.

Along with von Einem, Brown is considered to be the most likely suspect for the Beaumont abduction as he bore a striking similarity to an identikit picture of the suspect for both the Beaumont and Oval cases. A search for a connection to the Beaumonts was unsuccessful as no employment records existed that could shed light on Brown's movements at the time. Some of the records were believed lost in the 1974 Brisbane flood. It is also possible that Brown, who had unrestricted access to government buildings, may have destroyed his own files.

Although there is no proof that he had ever visited Adelaide, a witness recalled having a conversation with Brown in which he mentioned having seen the Adelaide Festival Centre nearing completion, which would place him in the city shortly before the Oval abduction on 25 August 1973. However, no evidence has ever been found to connect Brown with Adelaide in 1966. Brown was 53 at the time of the Beaumont disappearance, which does not match the description of the suspect seen with the children, who was reported as being in his thirties.

James Ryan O'Neill

James O'Neill (born 1947), who in 1975 was sentenced to life imprisonment for the murder of a nine-year-old boy in Tasmania, is reported to have previously told a Kimberley station owner and several other acquaintances that he was responsible for the Beaumont disappearances. In 2006, O'Neill lost an injunction in the High Court of Australia to stop the broadcast of an ABC documentary, The Fishermen, which attempted to link him to the Beaumont case.

Former Victorian detective Gordon Davie spent three years speaking to O'Neill to win his confidence before filming him for the documentary. Davie said that although there was no evidence to link O'Neill to the Beaumont case, he was persuaded that O'Neill was to blame. "I asked him about the Beaumonts and he said: 'I couldn't have done it. I was in Melbourne at that time.' That is not a denial." Later asked again if he had murdered the children, O'Neill replied, "Look, on legal advice I am not going to say where I was or when I was there." Although O'Neill claims never to have visited Adelaide, his work in the opal industry at the time required that he frequently visit Coober Pedy, which would have required him to pass through Adelaide. Davie also suspected O'Neill was involved in the Adelaide Oval abductions. The South Australia Police have interviewed O'Neill and discounted him as a suspect in the Beaumont case.

Derek Ernest Percy

Derek Percy (1948–2013), a convicted child killer and Victoria's then-longest-serving prisoner, was suggested in a 2007 article in Melbourne's The Age as a suspect in the Beaumont case. The Age alleged that evidence gathered by cold-case investigators indicated that Percy was a likely suspect for a number of unsolved child murders, including the Beaumont children. His insanity plea in the 1969 murder of Yvonne Tuohy was at least partly based on his suffering a psychological condition that could prevent him remembering details of his actions. He was supposed to have indicated that he believed he might have killed the Beaumont children, as he was in the area at the time, but he had no recollection of actually doing so. On 30 August 2007, Victoria Police successfully applied for permission to question Percy in relation to the Beaumont case.

In 1966, Percy was aged 17 and therefore seems too young to have been the man seen with the children by several witnesses. It is also unknown whether Percy would have had a car at that time, while the Beaumont suspect is presumed by commentators to have had access to one for facilitating a quick getaway and also for disposing of the children's bodies later. Percy was in prison from 1969 until his death in 2013, which means that he could not have been the suspect in the Adelaide Oval abductions, whom many investigators believe to be connected to the Beaumont disappearance.

Alan Anthony Munro
Allan Maxwell McIntyre (died 2017)—who had himself been investigated by police and cleared of involvement in the Beaumont case—gave a secondhand account to the Adelaide Advertiser that a man he had known in 1966, who by 2015 was being sought in Southeast Asia in connection with child abuse incidents there, had come to his home with the children's bodies in the boot of his car. McIntyre's children said that they and their father initially mistook Arnna's body for that of a boy because of her short haircut. 

The man in question was later identified as businessman Alan Anthony Munro (aged 75 in 2017), a former Scoutmaster who had pleaded guilty to ten child sex offences dating back to 1962. For these crimes, he was sentenced to ten years imprisonment, with a non-parole period of five years and five months, making him eligible for release in 2022.

In June 2017, Adelaide detectives were given a copy of a child's diary, written in 1966, which allegedly placed Munro in the vicinity of Glenelg Beach at the time of the Beaumont disappearance. He was convicted of abusing several children, including one of McIntyre's sons, who was a contributor to the diary. Munro had been previously investigated by police but no evidence had been found that he was involved in the Beaumont case.

Harry Phipps 
Harry Phipps (died 2004), a local factory owner and then-member of Adelaide's social elite, came to attention as a possible suspect after the publication of the book The Satin Man: Uncovering the Mystery of the Missing Beaumont Children in 2013. The book did not name the identity of the Satin Man, but Phipps's estranged son, Haydn, named him soon after the book's publication.

Phipps bore a substantial likeness to the identity of the man seen talking to the Beaumont children at Glenelg Beach. He was wealthy and known to be in the habit of giving out £1 notes, was later alleged to have paedophile tendencies, and lived only 300 metres away from the beach on the corner of Augusta Street and Sussex Street. Haydn, who was aged 15 at the time of the disappearance, came forward to researchers in 2007 with the claim that he had seen the children in his father's yard that day. Two other persons, youths at the time, said that they had been paid by Phipps to dig a 2 × 1 × 2-metre hole in his factory yard that weekend, for unstated reasons.

In November 2013, a one-metre-squared section of a factory in North Plympton, which had been owned by Phipps, was excavated. A ground-penetrating radar found "one small anomaly, which can indicate movement or objects within the soil", but the dig found no additional evidence and investigations into the site were closed. On 22 January 2018, Adelaide detectives announced that they would return to the factory site and conduct further excavations, after a private investigation sponsored by Channel Seven Adelaide. The excavation, on 2 February 2018, took nine hours. Animal bones and general rubbish were found, but nothing related to the Beaumont case.

Possibly related cases

Joanne Ratcliffe and Kirste Gordon

In 1973, two children, Joanne Ratcliffe (11) and Kirste Gordon (4), disappeared from the Adelaide Oval during a football match, and they are presumed to have been abducted and murdered. Ratcliffe's parents and Gordon's grandmother had allowed the girls to leave their group to go to the toilet. They were seen several times in the ninety minutes after leaving the Oval, apparently distressed and in the company of an unknown man, but they vanished after the last reported sighting. The police sketch of the suspect resembles that of the man last seen with the Beaumont children, but it is not a satisfactory identikit image. Detectives believe the cases may be linked.

The Family Murders

In 1979, the badly mutilated body of a young man was found in Adelaide, later identified as Neil Muir (25). In 1982, the similarly mutilated body of Mark Langley (18) was found. Before his death, he had been subjected to "surgery"—his abdomen had been sliced open, and part of his bowel had been removed. Over the next few months more bodies were found. The dismembered skeletal remains of Peter Stogneff (14) were found almost a year after his disappearance and Alan Barnes (18) was found mutilated in a similar manner to Langley. A fifth victim, Richard Kelvin (15), was found in 1983, once again with the same mutilations. Von Einem was convicted of Kelvin's murder in 1984 and was charged with the murders of Barnes and Langley in 1989. However, the prosecution was forced to enter a nolle prosequi (unwilling to pursue) when crucial evidence was deemed inadmissible. These crimes have been known collectively as the Family Murders; police believe that a core group of four people and up to eight associates were involved. Testimony given during von Einem's trial alleged he was involved in both the Beaumont and Oval abductions.

Legacy 
The Beaumont case resulted in one of the largest police investigations in Australian criminal history and remains one of Australia's most infamous cold cases, even after many decades. In January 2018, the Premier of South Australia, Jay Weatherill, said that South Australia Police had "never given up on the case" and that they "have a policy that no murder investigation ends up in a closed file". The State Government also continues to maintain a $1 million reward for information relating to the children's disappearance.

The kidnapping is also viewed by many social commentators as a significant event in the evolution of Australian society, with a large number of people changing the way they supervised their children daily. At the time, it was never publicly suggested that the children should not have been allowed to travel unsupervised, or that their parents were in any way negligent, simply because contemporary Australian society took it for granted that this was safe and acceptable. However, this case alongside similar child-related crimes (such as the 1960 Graeme Thorne kidnapping and the 1965 Wanda Beach murders) "marked an end of innocence in [post-war] Australian life".

The regular and widespread attention given to this case, its significance in Australian criminal history and the fact that the mystery of their disappearance has never been explained have led to the story being continually revisited by the media. New leads and clues are regularly reported by the media, and the case still regularly headlines print and broadcast media more than half a century on.

Parents 
At the time of the investigation, the Beaumont parents received widespread sympathy from the Australian public. They remained at their Somerton Park home; Nancy in particular held hope that the children would return, and stated in interviews that it would be "dreadful" if the children returned home and did not find their parents waiting for them. Over the years, as new leads and new theories emerged, the Beaumonts co-operated fully in exploring every possibility, whether it was claims that the children had been abducted by a religious cult and were living variously in New Zealand, Melbourne, or Tasmania, or some clue that suggested a possible burial site for the children. They were devastated in 1990 when newspapers published computer-generated photographs of how the children would have looked as adults. The pictures, published against their wishes, caused a huge wave of public sympathy from a community which is still sensitive to their pain.

The couple later divorced and lived separately, having resolved to live their final years away from the public attention that followed them for decades. They sold their home and, while the case remains open, the South Australian Police remains informed of the couple's new addresses. The Beaumonts were reported to have accepted that the truth of their children's disappearances may never be discovered. Nancy died in Adelaide on 16 September 2019, in a nursing home, aged 92, whereas Jim, also aged in his 90s, continues to reside in Adelaide.

Media 
The case attracted widespread police and media attention in Australia and beyond. The fact that the case has never been explained has led to the story being continually revisited by the media, and by newer online sites, more than 50 years after the children's disappearance. Some examples include:

See also 
 List of people who disappeared mysteriously: pre-1970

References

Further reading

External links 
Jane, Arnna and Grant Beaumont, at the Australian Federal Police's National Missing Persons Coordination Centre.

1960s in Adelaide
1960s missing person cases
1966 crimes in Australia
1966 in Australia
January 1966 events in Australia
Australian children
Crime in Adelaide
Missing Australian children
Mass disappearances